Esmaeil Khatib (born 1961) is an Iranian cleric and politician who has been serving as the minister of intelligence since August 2021. He is the eighth official to hold the post.

Early life and education
Khatib was born in Qaen, South Khorasan, in 1961. He studied Islamic jurisprudence in Qom. He was a pupil of leading figures such as Ali Khamenei, Mohammad Fazel Lankarani, Naser Makarem Shirazi and Mojtaba Tehrani.

Career
Khatib has the title of Hujjat al-Islam, meaning proof of Islam in English. Previous posts of Khatib included the head of the Information Protection Center of the Judiciary and head of Astan Quds Razavi Security. He also worked in the Office of the Supreme Leader, Ali Khamenei, as Iran's chief warden, and in the intelligence department of the Islamic Revolutionary Guard Corps (IRGC) as well as in the Ministry of Intelligence.

In 1985 Khatib was assigned to the intelligence unit of the IRGC by Mohsen Rezaei who was the first commander-in-chief of the corps. Khatib was in the post until 1991. During the tenure of the Minister of Intelligence Ali Fallahian Khatib was appointed head of the ministry's regional branch in Qom in 1999. Khatib was appointed chief warden in the Office of Supreme Leader in 2010.

Khatib was nominated as the minister of intelligence to the cabinet of Iranian President Ebrahim Raisi and was confirmed by the Majlis on 25 August 2021. He received 222 votes in favor. Khatib replaced Mahmoud Alavi in the post.

Views
Khatib is one of the close allies of Ali Khamenei and was also a supporter of Ayatollah Ruhollah Khomeini. He has close connections with other significant religious figures in Iran most of whom are his teachers.

References

External links

21st-century Iranian politicians
1961 births
Living people
Ministers of Intelligence of Iran
People from South Khorasan Province
Iranian wardens
Qom Seminary alumni
Iranian individuals subject to the U.S. Department of the Treasury sanctions